Sermoneta Gloves is a Rome-based manufacturer, designer, and retailer of high fashion mostly-leather and suede gloves for women and men. The company was founded by artisan Giorgio Sermoneta in 1960.

Current line
As of 2012, amongst their various designs, Sermoneta produces sixty-one separate styles of gloves. Forty-five are women's and sixteen are men's styles. Currently Sermoneta includes these glove-outers:
Kidskin leather, forty-six styles.
Deerskin leather, two styles.
Cashmere wool, one style.
Sheepskin shearling, two styles.
Suede, four styles.
Pigskin leather, two styles.
Suede back/Kidskin leather palm, two styles.
Satin, one style.
Peccary leather, one style.

Worldwide locations
Besides from being purchased online, as of 2012, Sermoneta operates boutiques in the following international cities:

Eurasia
Rome, Italy (flagship store)
Florence, Italy
Venice, Italy
Milan, Italy
Vienna, Austria
London, United Kingdom
Moscow, Russia
Osaka, Japan
Tokyo, Japan
Nagoya, Japan

North America
New York, New York
Boston, Massachusetts
Chicago, Illinois
Toronto, Canada

In popular culture
The American singer/songwriter and actress Katy Perry wore yellow Sermoneta fingerless leather gloves for the May 2012 cover of Teen Vogue.
The fictional character Serena van der Woodsen in Cecily von Ziegesar's 2011 novel Gossip Girl, Psycho Killer wear's taupe-colored Sermoneta kidskin gloves when she sneaks into the home of her friend Nate Archibald.

References

Clothing companies of Italy
Gloves
Fashion accessory brands
High fashion brands
Companies based in Rome
Clothing companies established in 1960
Italian brands
Italian companies established in 1960